This is a list of areas in the London Borough of Ealing:

Acton (W3)
Bedford Park (Acton, W3, Chiswick, W4). (Partly in the London Borough of Hounslow)
Dormers Wells (Southall)
Ealing (W5, W13)
East Acton (Acton W3). (Partly in the London Borough of Hammersmith and Fulham)
Ealing Common (W5)
Greenford (UB6)
Hanwell (W7)
Montpelier (Ealing, W5)
Norwood Green (Southall, UB2)
North Acton (Acton, W3, NW10)
Northfields (Ealing, W5 & W13)
Northolt (UB5)
Norwood Green (Southall, UB2). (Partly in the London Borough of Hounslow)
Perivale (UB6)
Pitshanger (Ealing, W5 & W13)
Sudbury (Greenford, UB6)
South Acton (Acton, W3). (Partly in the London Borough of Hounslow)
Southall (UB2, UB3)
South Ealing (Ealing, W5)
West Ealing (Ealing, W13)
West Twyford (Ealing, W5 & NW10)
Park Royal (Acton, W3 & NW10). (Partly in the London Borough of Brent)

Lists of places in London